Johann(es) Gutslaff (died 1657 in Tallinn) was a Baltic-German clergyman, scholar, Estonian language enthusiast, Bible translator, and folklore collector.

He studied at Greifswald University (1632) and at Leipzig University (1634).

In 1639 he came to Estonia. There he attended the Faculty of Theology at Tartu University. At the university, he also studied the South Estonian language. 
From 1641 to 1656 he was a pastor in Urvaste and there he wrote all his writings.

He died in 1657 in Tallinn, being infected by the plague.

Works
In 1648 he compiled the first grammar of South Estonian: "Observationes grammaticae circa linguam esthonicam".

Gutslaff wanted to translate whole Bible into South Estonian. He did not finish the translation. Until today, his translations of the Old Testament up to First Book of Kings are preserved. There are also indirect evidences, that some parts of the New Testament were translated by Gutslaff.

References

Baltic-German people
Estonian Christian clergy
1657 deaths
Year of birth unknown